St Gabriel's Church may refer to one of these churches dedicated to the archangel Gabriel:

Israel
an alternative name for the Greek Orthodox Church of the Annunciation in Nazareth

United Kingdom

London
St Gabriel's Church, Aldersbrook
St Gabriel's Church, Canning Town
St Gabriel's, Cricklewood
St Gabriel Fenchurch
St Gabriel's Church, North Acton
St Gabriel's, Warwick Square

West Midlands
St Gabriel's Church, Deritend
St Gabriel's Church, Walsall
St Gabriel's Church, Weoley Castle

United States

Florida
St. Gabriel's Episcopal Church (Titusville, Florida)

New York
St. Gabriel's Roman Catholic Church (Bronx, New York)
St. Gabriel's Church (Manhattan)
St. Gabriel's Church (New Rochelle, New York)

Pennsylvania
Old St. Gabriel's Episcopal Church, Douglassville